Sakunthala is a 1966 Telugu-language Hindu mythological film directed by Kamalakara Kameswara Rao. The film stars N. T. Rama Rao and B. Saroja Devi, with music composed by Ghantasala. It is produced by Lakshmi Rajyam and Sridhar Rao under the Rajyam Productions banner.

Plot
The film begins with Saint Viswamitra and Menaka leaving a newborn baby in the forest, Kanva Maharshi finds the baby surrounded by birds, therefore, she is named Sakunthala and raises her. Once King Dushyanta encounters Sakunthala while hunting, he loves and marries her as per the Gandharva marriage. Before returning, Dushyanta gives his royal ring to Sakunthala as a symbol of his love. One day, Saint Durvasa, comes to the ashram but, Sakunthala is lost in her thoughts on her husband and fails to greet him properly when he curses her saying that the person, she is dreaming of will forget her. As he departed in a rage, Sakunthala's friends Anasuya and Priyamvada say sorry for their friend's deed and request him to pardon her. Now Durvasa modifies his curse saying that the person gets back his memory when he sees the personal token given to her.

Time passes, and Sakunthala becomes pregnant, so, Kanva Maharshi sends Sakunthala to her husband. On the way, they cross a river, and the ring slips off her finger and is swallowed by a fish. Arriving at Hastinapuram, Dushyanta is not able to recognize her, humiliated, Sakunthala returns to the forest and takes shelter at Kasyapa Mahamuni's Asram, where she gives birth to a baby boy Bharata. Meanwhile, fishermen (Relangi and Ramana Reddy) find a royal ring in the belly of a fish and take it to the palace when Dushyanta recollects the past. Immediately he set out to find Sakunthala, in the forest, he is surprised by a young boy playing with wild animals and amazed by his boldness and strength. At last, the boy takes him to his mother Sakunthala, and thus the couple is reunited. Finally, the movie ends on a happy note with the crowning ceremony of Bharata.

Cast
N. T. Rama Rao as Dushyanta
B. Saroja Devi as Sakunthala
Nagayya as Kanva Maharshi
Relangi as Achigadu, fisherman
Ramana Reddy as Buchigadu, fisherman
Padmanabham as Madhava
Mukkamala as Visvamitra
K.V.S.Sharma as Durvasa
Geetanjali as Anasuya
Sarada as Priyamvada
Pushpavalli as Raja Maata
E. V. Saroja as Menaka
Nirmalamma as Arya Gowthami
Baby Kutty Padmini as Bharata

Soundtrack

Music was composed by Ghantasala.

References

Hindu mythological films
Films directed by Kamalakara Kameswara Rao
Films scored by Ghantasala (musician)
Films based on the Mahabharata
Films based on works by Kalidasa
Works based on Shakuntala (play)